Hawks Green (Also known as Hayes Green) is a suburban village and ward in Cannock Chase, Staffordshire. Located between Cannock and Heath Hayes, the area is predominantly residential with a large superstore, fuel station, pub and community centre. The village borders Stoney Lea, Heath Hayes and Church Hill. There is a regular bus connecting the village to Cannock.

References
 https://www.cannockchasedc.gov.uk/residents/leisure/parks-open-spaces/countryside-service/hawks-green-and-mill-green-valleys-nature
 https://www.cannockchasedc.gov.uk/custom/HeritageTrail/mill_green.html
 https://www.staffordshire.gov.uk/Heritage-and-Archives/Local-and-community-history/placeguide/SPGCannock.aspx
 https://www.cannockchasedc.gov.uk/wards/hawks-green-ward
 https://www.uklocalarea.com/index.php?q=Hawks+Green&wc=41UBFZ&lsoa=E01029376&schools=y

Villages in Staffordshire
Cannock Chase District